Joseph Jaquenoud (1901 – 29 January 1988) was a Swiss weightlifter. He competed at the 1924 Summer Olympics and the 1928 Summer Olympics.

References

External links
 

1901 births
1988 deaths
Swiss male weightlifters
Olympic weightlifters of Switzerland
Weightlifters at the 1924 Summer Olympics
Weightlifters at the 1928 Summer Olympics
Place of birth missing